Hamdouchi is an Arabic surname. Notable people with the surname include:

 Abdelilah Hamdouchi (born 1958), Moroccan writer
 Hichem Hamdouchi (born 1972), Moroccan-French chess grandmaster
  (born 1979), French chess player

Arabic-language surnames